Ann Jones (born September 3, 1937) is an American journalist and author of a number of non-fiction books about her research into women's and humanitarian issues: Women Who Kill, Kabul in Winter, Looking for Lovedu, Next Time She'll be Dead and When Love Goes Wrong. She has also written and taken photographs for a number of publications including National Geographic Traveler, Outside, The Nation, The San Francisco Chronicle and The New York Times. The majority of her work and writings centers on women's issues, especially domestic violence. Jones has provided humanitarian aid around the world, including Afghanistan, Liberia, Sierra Leone and the Ivory Coast. She currently resides in Oslo, Norway.

Biography
Ann Jones was born September 3, 1937, in Eau Claire, Wisconsin, the daughter of insurance broker Oscar Trygve Slagsvol and musician Bernice Slagsvol. She grew up in Wisconsin and graduated from Eau Claire Memorial High School in 1955. She received a doctorate in American literature and intellectual history from the University of Wisconsin–Madison in 1970, and taught English at City College of New York from 1970 to 1973. She served as coordinator of women's studies at the University of Massachusetts Amherst (1973–1975) and was a member of the writing faculty at Mount Holyoke College (1986–1997). In 2002 Jones became a human rights researcher, teacher and women's advocate in Afghanistan.

Books

Women's violence issues
Women Who Kill, originally published in 1980 and then re-printed in 1996 was Jones' first widely released and read book and included coverage of notable mysteries including that of Lizzie Borden. The book led to Jones being interviewed on subjects such as female incarceration,  battered wives, and other issues affecting female violence. The book included controversial issues including whether homicide was a woman's last defense if she could not get support from others, including the police. Next Time She'll be Dead, like When Women Kill, examined known cases of domestic violence and its effect on women, including Hedda Nussbaum. When Love Goes Wrong., which Jones co-wrote with Susan Schechter, was intended as a resource for women suffering from abuse.

Travel related

Kabul in Winter, written about Jones' experience in Afghanistan in 2002 and her observations of a city utterly destroyed by war, warlords and the Taliban where she felt a need to try to pick up the pieces. While in Afghanistan, Jones drew on her training as an English teacher and helped to re-train the city's teachers, a challenge in a city where more than 95% of the women are affected by domestic violence. Jones is critical of the George W. Bush administration, especially its policies in Afghanistan, and the ways in which relief funds are used, and her book touches on how those policies made working in Afghanistan somewhat of a challenge.

She has also reported from Afghanistan while embedded with U.S. and Afghan National Army troops.

Looking for Lovedu, chronicles Jones' experience as she travels the length of Africa from Morocco to South Africa and her experiences with border guards, who could not understand her travelling on her own. Jones took the trip with British photographer Kevin Muggleton as a search for South Africa's Lovedu tribe, but the trip ended up to be about far more, including women's issues in present-day Africa.

Bibliography
 Uncle Tom's Campus. New York: Praeger, 1973.
 . New York: Holt, Rinehart and Winston, 1980. Second revised edition Beacon Press (Boston), 1996; Feminist Press, 1 October 2009, 
 Everyday Death: The Case of Bernadette Powell. New York: Holt, 1985.
When Love Goes Wrong: What to Do When You Can't Do Anything Right (with Susan Schechter). New York: HarperCollins, 1992.
  Boston: Beacon Press, 1994. Revised and updated edition, 2000. 
 Guide to America's Outdoors: Middle-Atlantic (photography by Skip Brown). Washington, D.C.: National Geographic Society, 2001.

 
 
  Dispatch books/Haymarket Books. .  October 2013.

References

External links

 Ann Jones Online, official site

1937 births
Living people
20th-century American writers
21st-century American writers
20th-century American women writers
21st-century American women writers
American expatriates in Afghanistan
American expatriates in Norway
American feminist writers
City College of New York faculty
Mount Holyoke College faculty
People from Eau Claire, Wisconsin
University of Massachusetts Amherst faculty
University of Wisconsin–Madison School of Journalism & Mass Communication alumni
Writers from Massachusetts
Writers from Wisconsin
American women academics